The 2017 Austrian Darts Open was the seventh of twelve PDC European Tour events on the 2017 PDC Pro Tour. The tournament took place at Multiversum Schwechat, Vienna, Austria between 23–25 June 2017. It featured a field of 48 players and £135,000 in prize money, with £25,000 going to the winner.

Phil Taylor was the defending champion after defeating Michael Smith 6–4 in the final of the 2016 tournament, but he decided not to participate in the tournament in 2017.

Michael van Gerwen won the title, defeating Michael Smith 6–5 in the final.

Prize money 
This is how the prize money is divided:

Qualification and format 
The top 16 players from the PDC ProTour Order of Merit on 11 May automatically qualified for the event and were seeded in the second round.

The remaining 32 places went to players from five qualifying events – 18 from the UK Qualifier (held in Milton Keynes on 19 May), eight from the West/South European Qualifier (held on 31 May), four from the Host Nation Qualifier (held on 22 June), one from the Nordic & Baltic Qualifier (held on 19 May) and one from the East European Qualifier (held on 22 June).

Adrian Lewis withdrew for health reasons the day before the event, meaning a fifth Host Nation Qualifier will take his place.

The following players took part in the tournament:

Top 16
  Michael van Gerwen (champion)
  Peter Wright (second round)
  Mensur Suljović (third round)
  Simon Whitlock (third round)
  Benito van de Pas (third round)
  Jelle Klaasen (third round)
  Kim Huybrechts (third round)
  Alan Norris (second round)
  Ian White (second round)
  Joe Cullen (semi-finals)
  Michael Smith (runner-up)
  Daryl Gurney (quarter-finals)
  Cristo Reyes (semi-finals)
  Mervyn King (quarter-finals)
  Stephen Bunting (second round)
  Steve West (second round)

UK Qualifier 
  Adrian Lewis (withdrew)
  Jamie Lewis (second round)
  Wayne Jones (first round)
  David Pallett (first round)
  James Wilson (first round)
  Rob Cross (second round)
  Chris Dobey (third round)
  Lee Bryant (first round)
  Andy Jenkins (first round)
  Justin Pipe (first round)
  Adrian Gray (first round)
  Jonny Clayton (second round)
  John Henderson (second round)
  Tony Newell (first round)
  Chris Quantock (second round)
  Paul Rowley (first round)
  Ritchie Edhouse (first round)
  Jamie Bain (third round)

West/South European Qualifier
  Vincent van der Voort (second round)
  Christian Kist (first round)
  Vincent van der Meer (third round)
  Martin Schindler (quarter-finals)
  Dirk van Duijvenbode (first round)
  Ronny Huybrechts (second round)
  René Eidams (second round)
  Dimitri Van den Bergh (first round)

Host Nation Qualifier
  Roxy-James Rodriguez (first round)
  Rowby-John Rodriguez (first round)
  Christian Kallinger (second round)
  Zoran Lerchbacher (second round)
  Rusty-Jake Rodriguez (second round)

Nordic & Baltic Qualifier
  Kim Viljanen (quarter-finals)

East European Qualifier
  Krzysztof Ratajski (first round)

Draw

References 

2017 PDC European Tour
2017 in Austrian sport